Bejucal is a municipality and town in the Mayabeque Province of Cuba. It was founded in 1713. It is well known as the terminal station of the first railroad built in Cuba and Latin America in 1837. It also hosts one of the most popular and traditional carnival fest in Cuba: "Charangas de Bejucal". Bejucal has also been known as a telecomunications site, hosting broadcasts of several news and media networks. It was also host to Soviet nuclear warheads during the Cuban Missile Crisis.

Geography
The municipality borders to the north with Boyeros (a municipal borough of Havana); to the east with San José de las Lajas; to the south with Quivicán; and on the west with San Antonio de los Baños.

It is divided into the barrios of Bejucal, Beltrán, Cuatro Caminos, Rancho Recreo, Buenaventura, Caguazo and Río Hondo.

Demographics
In 2004, the municipality of Bejucal had a population of 25,425.

Notable residents
Notable current and former residents of Bejucal include:
Andy García, actor, was born and lived here until the age of five.
NJ Perez, author of highly acclaimed historical novels.

See also
Bejucal Municipal Museum
Municipalities of Cuba
List of cities in Cuba

References

External links

Populated places in Mayabeque Province